The Saudi Council of Engineers (SCE) is a professional body intended to promote the engineering profession and develop and upgrade its standards and those practicing it. It operates under the supervision of Ministry of Commerce and Investment with headquarters in Riyadh.

Overview and responsibilities
The Council was established by a royal decree issued by the King Fahd bin Abdul Aziz Al Saud in 2002. The organization's stated responsibilities are:

 Setting criteria and standards
 Professional development
 Setting license terms and conditions
 Setting rules and regulations
 Conducting examinations for obtaining professional status

See also 
Saudi Commission for Health Specialties

External links 
 SCE official website
 English version

Professional associations based in Saudi Arabia
Engineering organizations